Afters may refer to:

 the British slang for dessert
 Afters (1990 film), a 1990 British television film by Polly Teale 
 Afters (album), a 1980 compilation album by Hatfield and the North
 The Afters, an American Christian rock group